Civic Alliance may refer to:

 Civic Alliance Foundation, an NGO in Romania
 Civic Alliance (Bosnia and Herzegovina), a political party
 Civic Alliance of Kosovo, a political party in Kosovo
 Civic Alliance of Serbia, a political party in Serbia
 Civic Democratic Alliance, a political party in the Czech Republic
 Civic Liberal Alliance, a political party in Croatia
 Center Civic Alliance, a political coalition in Poland
 Hungarian Civic Alliance (disambiguation), multiple political parties
Civil Alliance, a political party in Jordan

See also
 Citizens' Alliance (disambiguation)